Jack Alexander James (born 26 January 2000) is a professional footballer who plays as a defender for National League North club Gloucester City.

Club career
James made his first-team debut for Luton Town as a half-time substitute for James Justin against Tottenham Hotspur U21s in an EFL Trophy group stage match on 15 August 2017, which the team won with a 4–2 penalty shoot-out victory following a 2–2 draw after normal time. He signed his first professional contract with the club at the end of the 2017–18 season.

In January 2018, James was loaned out to Hitchin Town for one month. His first start for Luton Town came on 13 November 2018 in a 2–1 defeat to Peterborough United in the EFL Trophy.

On 19 January 2019, he was loaned out to Havant & Waterlooville on a one-month youth loan. On 15 February, the loan was extended until the end of the season.

On 12 October 2019, James joined National League South side, Braintree Town.

International career
James is eligible to represent the Republic of Ireland at international level. He was called into the Republic of Ireland under-18 squad in March 2018, playing in two games.

James was later called up to the Republic of Ireland under-19 squad ahead of three qualifying matches for the 2019 UEFA European Under-19 Championship in October 2018. He played at left-back in all three games as Ireland topped their group.

Career statistics

References

External links

Jack James at Aylesbury United

2000 births
Living people
English footballers
Republic of Ireland association footballers
Republic of Ireland youth international footballers
Association football defenders
Luton Town F.C. players
Hitchin Town F.C. players
Havant & Waterlooville F.C. players
Braintree Town F.C. players
Gloucester City A.F.C. players
Southern Football League players
National League (English football) players
English people of Irish descent
Sportspeople from Bedford
Footballers from Bedfordshire